The Neuse River (Tuscarora: Neyuherú·kęʔkì·nęʔ) is a river rising in the Piedmont of North Carolina and emptying into Pamlico Sound below New Bern. The Trent River joins the Neuse at New Bern. It is formed by the confluence of the Flat and Eno rivers prior to entering the Falls Lake reservoir in northern Wake County. Its fall line shoals, known as the Falls of the Neuse, lie submerged under the waters of Falls Lake.

Geography

The Neuse begins at the confluence of the Flat and Eno rivers near Durham, North Carolina. The river enters Pamlico Sound just east of Maw Point Shoal near Hobucken, North Carolina while en route to the Atlantic Ocean.

Typical of rivers in the Coastal Plain of North Carolina, the Neuse enters a basin of chocolate intermittent bottomland swamp on its journey towards its outlet.  One interesting exception is the "Cliffs of the Neuse" area near Goldsboro, where the river cuts a narrow 30 m (90 ft) gorge through limestone and sandstone bluffs.  The Neuse is prone to extremes in its flow carriage, often escaping its banks during wet periods, then reducing to a trickle that can be forded on foot during prolonged drought conditions.
 
The Neuse flows through parts of seven counties.  Major cities and towns in proximity to the Neuse are Durham; Neuse Township; Raleigh, the capital of North Carolina; Smithfield; Goldsboro; Kinston and New Bern.

History
For thousands of years before the Europeans arrived, different civilizations of indigenous peoples lived along the river.  Many artifacts found along its banks have been traced to ancient prehistoric Native American settlements.  Archaeological studies have shown waves of habitation.

The river has one of the three oldest surviving English-applied placenames in the U.S. Explorers named the Neuse River after the American Indian tribe known as Neusiok, with whom the early Raleigh expeditions made contact.  They also identified the region as the "Neusick".  Two English captains, Arthur Barlowe and Phillip Amadas, were commissioned by Sir Walter Raleigh in 1584 to explore the New World.  They landed on North Carolina's coast July 2, 1584 to begin their research. In their 1585 report to Raleigh, they wrote favorably of the Indian population in "…the country Neusiok, situated upon a goodly river called Neuse…", as it was called by the local population.

In 1865 during the American Civil War, the Confederates burned one of the last ironclad warships which they had built, the Ram Neuse, to prevent its capture by Union troops.  The level of the river had fallen so that it prevented the ship from passing downriver.  Nearly a century later, during another period of historically low water, the remains of the ship were discovered.  It was raised in 1963.  Later the ship was installed beside the river at the Governor Caswell Memorial in Kinston.

William Larry Stewart II, a.k.a. Billy Stewart (March 24, 1937 – January 17, 1970), an American rhythm and blues singer and pianist, died in a broad-daylight car accident in January 1970, just two months prior to his 33rd birthday. The accident happened when the Ford Thunderbird that Stewart was driving approached a bridge across the Neuse River near Smithfield, North Carolina. His car left the highway, ran along the median strip at a slight angle to the highway, struck the bridge abutment, and then plunged into the river, killing Stewart and his three passengers instantly.

The low-head Quaker Neck Dam was built in 1952 at Neuse River kilometer 225 to impound cooling water for a steam electric plant. A fish ladder was included.

Water quality

The Neuse has been plagued in recent years with environmental and public health problems related to municipal and agricultural waste water discharge, storm runoff, and other sources of pollution. Pollution was particularly bad in the aftermath of hurricanes Fran and Floyd in the late 1990s.

The dinoflagellate Pfiesteria piscicida is present in the river, and has a bloom in growth when nutrient levels are increased due to too much runoff.  This organism may be connected to fish kills as well as adverse health effects in grapes.

Tributaries
Eno River
Flat River
Little River
Stoney Creek
Crabtree Creek
Walnut Creek
West Bear Creek
Bear Creek
Contentnea Creek
Lefferts' Creek
Trent River

See also
 South Atlantic-Gulf Water Resource Region

References

External links

Neuse Riverkeeper Foundation
NCDENR: Neuse River Basin
NCSU: Neuse River Basin
USGS: Neuse River Current Conditions
Upper Neuse River Basin Association
Neuse River Compliance Association and Lower Neuse Basin Association
The Neuse, River of Peace
Events and Happening Along the Neuse River

 
Environment of North Carolina
Geography of Raleigh, North Carolina
Rivers of Carteret County, North Carolina
Rivers of Craven County, North Carolina
Rivers of Durham County, North Carolina
Rivers of Granville County, North Carolina
Rivers of Johnston County, North Carolina
Rivers of Lenoir County, North Carolina
Rivers of Pamlico County, North Carolina
Rivers of Pitt County, North Carolina
Rivers of Wake County, North Carolina
Rivers of Wayne County, North Carolina

Rivers of North Carolina
Tributaries of Pamlico Sound